Dirk Bezemer (born 1971) is a Dutch economist who is a professor at the Faculty of Economics and Business
of the Rijksuniversiteit Groningen. He studied at Wageningen University (M.Sc. in Economics (1995)) and University of Amsterdam & Tinbergen Institute (Ph.D. in Economics (2001)).  His topics of expertise include the financial sector, credit creation, credit cycles, monetary policy, and the cause of economic crises. Bezemer provides commentary at the Centre for Economic Policy Research and De Groene Amsterdammer. In a September 2009 article in the Financial Times he wrote that a dozen economists whom he listed had seen the 2007-08 financial crisis coming for years, but were ignored.

Notes

External links

Living people
Academic staff of the University of Groningen
University of Amsterdam alumni
Wageningen University and Research alumni
Year of birth missing (living people)